Thryssocypris is a genus of cyprinid fish found in Southeast Asia.

Species
There are currently four recognized species in this genus:
 Thryssocypris ornithostoma Kottelat, 1991
 Thryssocypris smaragdinus T. R. Roberts & Kottelat, 1984
 Thryssocypris tonlesapensis T. R. Roberts & Kottelat, 1984
 Thryssocypris wongrati C. Grudpan & J. Grudpan, 2012

References

Cyprinidae genera
Cyprinid fish of Asia